Henry Laurens Pinckney (September 24, 1794February 3, 1863) was a U.S. Representative from South Carolina, and the son of Charles Pinckney and Mary Eleanor Laurens.

Born in Charleston, South Carolina, Pinckney attended private schools. He graduated from South Carolina College (now the University of South Carolina) at Columbia in 1812. He studied law and was admitted to the bar and commenced practice in Charleston.

Pinckney served as a member of the South Carolina House of Representatives (1816–1832). He founded the Charleston Mercury in 1819 and was its sole editor for fifteen years. Between 1829 and 1840, he served six terms as intendant or mayor of Charleston. In 1838, he won among a field of four candidates with the following votes: Pinckney (600), Col. James Lynah (575), Dr. Joseph Johnston (203), and Dr. J.W. Schmidt (141).

Pinckney was elected as a Nullifier to the Twenty-third and Twenty-fourth Congresses (March 4, 1833 – March 3, 1837). He was an unsuccessful candidate for renomination in 1836, having been labelled a "traitor" by ultra-conservative Southerners for compromising with New York's Martin van Buren on the 1836 "gag-rule" bill.

Pinckney served as collector of the port of Charleston in 1841 and 1842 and as the tax collector of St. Philip's and St. Michael's parishes (1845–1863).

Pinckney married Harriet Lee Post, the daughter of Chaplain of the Senate Reuben Post and Harriet Moffitt, a granddaughter of Richard Henry Lee. He died in Charleston, South Carolina on February 3, 1863 (during the time when South Carolina had seceded and joined the Confederate States) and was buried in the Circular Congregational Church Burying Ground.

References

Sources

1794 births
1863 deaths
Businesspeople from Charleston, South Carolina
Members of the United States House of Representatives from South Carolina
Pinckney family
Mayors of Charleston, South Carolina
Nullifier Party members of the United States House of Representatives
Nullifier Party politicians
19th-century American politicians
U.S. Congressional gag rules and their sponsors